This article lists the rulers of Tibet from the beginning of legendary history. Included are regimes with their base in Central Tibet, that held authority over at least a substantial portion of the country.

Pre-Imperial Yarlung dynasty

 Nyatri Tsenpo
 Mutri Tsenpo (son)
 Dingtri Tsenpo (son)
 Sotri Tsenpo (son)
 Mertri Tsenpo (son)
 Daktri Tsenpo (son)
 Siptri Tsenpo (son)
 Drigum Tsenpo (son)
 Pude Gunggyal (son)
 Esho Leg (son)
 Desho Leg (son)
 Tisho Leg (son)
 Gongru Leg (son)
 Drongzher Leg (son)
 Isho Leg (son)
 Zanam Zindé (son)
 Detrul Namzhungtsen (son)
 Senöl Namdé (son)
 Senöl Podé (son)
 Denöl Nam (son)
 Denöl Po (son)
 Degyal Po (son)
 Detring Tsen (son)
 Tore Longtsen (son)
 Tritsun Nam (son)
 Tridra Pungtsen (son)
 Tritog Jethogtsen (son)
 Lha Thothori (son)
 Trinyen Zungtsen (son)
 Drongnyen Deu (son)
 Tagri Nyenzig (son)
 Namri Songtsen ?–618 (son)

Tibetan Empire 

 Songtsen Gampo 618–641 (son of Namri Songtsen)
 Gungsong Gungtsen 641–646 (son)
 Songtsen Gampo 646–649 (second time)
 Mangsong Mangtsen 649–677 (son of Gungsong Gungtsen)
 Tridu Songtsen 677–704 (son)
 Lha 704–705 (son)
 Khri ma lod 705–712 (widow of Mangsong Mangtsen)
 Me Agtsom 712–755 (son of Tridu Songtsen)
 Trisong Detsen 756–797 (son)
 Muné Tsenpo 797–799 (son)
 Tride Songtsen 799–815 (brother)
 Ralpachen 815–838 (son)
 Langdarma 838–842 (brother)

Yuan dynasty and Sakya rulers

Sakya lamas
 Sakya Pandita Kunga Gyaltsen 1216–1251 (Mongol protégé 1247)
 Phagpa Drakpa Gyaltsen 1251–1280 (nephew)
 Dharmapala Raksita 1280–1282 (nephew)
 Jamyang Rinchen Gyaltsen 1286–1303 (of Sharpa lineage)
 Zangpo Pal 1306–1323 (nephew of Phagpa Drakpa Gyaltsen)
 Khatsun Namkha Lekpa Gyaltsen 1325–1341 (son)
 Jamyang Donyo Gyaltsen 1341–1344 (brother)
 Lama Dampa Sonam Gyaltsen 1344–1347 (brother)
 Lotro Gyaltsen 1347–1365 (nephew)

Sakya Imperial Preceptors (Dishi)

 Phagpa Lodro Gyaltsen 1270–1274
 Rinchen Gyaltsen 1274–1279 (brother)
 Dharmapala Raksita 1282–1286 (nephew)
 Yeshe Rinchen 1286–1291
 Drakpa Odzer 1291–1303
 Jamyang Rinchen Gyaltsen 1304–1305 (brother of Yeshe Rinchen)
 Sanggye Pal 1305–1314 (brother of Drakpa Odzer)
 Kunga Lotro Gyaltsen 1314–1327 (grandnephew of Phagpa Drakpa Gyaltsen)
 Kunga Lekpa Jungne Gyaltsen 1327–1330 (brother)
 Kunga Gyaltsen 1331–1358 (brother)

Dpon-chens (Ponchens)

 Shakya Zangpo circa 1264–1270
 Kunga Zangpo circa 1270–1275
 Zhangtsun circa 1275–?
 Chukpo Gangkarwa ?–1280
 Changchub Rinchen 1281/82
 Kunga Zhonnu 1282–circa 1285
 Zhonnu Wangchuk circa 1285–1288
 Changchub Dorje circa 1289
 Aglen Dorje Pal circa 1290–1298
 Zhonnu Wangchuk 1298 (second time)
 Lekpa Pal 1298–circa 1305
 Sengge Pal early 14th century
 Odzer Sengge circa 1315–1317
 Kunga Rinchen circa 1319
 Donyo Pal circa 1320
 Yontsun Drakpa Dar before 1322
 Odzer Sengge ?–1328/29 (second time)
 Gyalwa Zangpo 1328/29–1333
 Wangchuk Pal 1333–1337
 Sonam Pal 1337–1344
 Gyalwa Zangpo 1344–1347 (second time)
 Wangtson 1347–circa 1350
 Gyalwa Zangpo circa 1350–1356/58 (third time)
 Namkha Tenpai Gyaltsen circa 1357
 Palbum ?–1360
 Namkha Tenpai Gyaltsen circa 1364 (second time)

Phagmodrupa dynasty

 Tai Situ Changchub Gyaltsen 1354–1364
 Jamyang Shakya Gyaltsen 1364–1373 (nephew)
 Drakpa Changchub 1374–1381 (nephew)
 Sonam Drakpa 1381–1385 (brother)
 Drakpa Gyaltsen 1385–1432 (cousin)
 Drakpa Jungne 1432–1445 (nephew)
 Kunga Lekpa 1448–1481 (brother)
 Ngagi Wangpo 1481–1491 (son of Drakpa Jungne)
 Tsokye Dorje 1491–1499 (regent, of Rinpungpa lineage)
 Ngawang Tashi Drakpa 1499–1554 (son of Ngagi Wangpo)
 Ngawang Drakpa Gyaltsen 1554–1556/57 (grandson)
 Ngawang Tashi Drakpa 1556/57–1564 (second time)
 Ngawang Drakpa Gyaltsen 1576–1603/04 (second time)
 Mipham Wanggyur Gyalpo 1604–1613 (possible grandnephew)
 Mipham Sonam Wangchuk Drakpa Namgyal Palzang 17th century (grandson of Ngawang Drakpa Gyaltsen)

Rinpungpa dynasty

 Norzang 1435–1466
 Kunzang 1466–circa 1479 (son)
 Donyo Dorje circa 1479–1512 (son)
 Ngawang Namgyal 1512–1544 (cousin)
 Dondup Tseten Dorje 1544–? (son)
 Ngawang Jigme Drakpa 1547–1565 (brother)

Tsangpa dynasty

 Karma Tseten 1565–1599
 Khunpang Lhawang Dorje circa 1582 – 1605/06 (son)
 Karma Thutob Namgyal circa 1586–1610 (brother)
 Karma Tensung 1599–1611 (brother)
 Karma Phuntsok Namgyal 1611–1620 (son of Karma Thutob)
 Karma Tenkyong 1620–1642 (son)

Gandan Phodrang and Qing dynasty

Khoshut kings of Tibet 

 Güshi Khan 1642–1655
 Dayan Khan 1655–1668 (son)
 Tenzin Dalai Khan 1668–1696 (son)
 Tenzin Wangchuk Khan 1696–1697 (son)
 Labzang Khan 1697–1717 (brother)

Dalai Lamas 

 5th Dalai Lama (Ngawang Lobsang Gyatso, 1642–1682)
 Regents: Sonam Rapten (1642–1658), Depa Norbu (1659–1660), Trinlé Gyatso (1660–1668), Lozang Tutop (1669–1675), Lozang Jinpa (1675–1679), Sangye Gyatso (1679–1703)
 6th Dalai Lama (Tsangyang Gyatso, 1697–1706)
 Regents: Ngawang Rinchen (1703–1706), Khangchennä (1721–1728)
 7th Dalai Lama (Kelzang Gyatso, 1720–1757)
 Regents: Polhanas (1728–1747), Gyurme Namgyal (1747–1750), the sixth Demo Rinpoche (1757–1777)
 8th Dalai Lama (Jamphel Gyatso, 1762–1804)
 Regents: the 1st Tsemonling Rinpoche (1777–1786), Yeshe Lobsang Tenpai Gonpo, the 8th Kundeling Lama (1791–1811), the 7th Demo Rinpoche (1811–1818)
 9th Dalai Lama (Lungtok Gyatso, 1810–1815)
 Regent: the 2nd Tsemonling Lama (1819–1844)
 10th Dalai Lama (Tsultrim Gyatso, 1826–1837)
 Regent: the 3rd Reting Rinpoche (1845–1862)
 11th Dalai Lama (Khedrup Gyatso, 1842–1856)
 12th Dalai Lama (Trinley Gyatso, 1860–1875)
 Desi: Shatra Wangchuk Gyalpo (1862–1864)
 Regents: Dedruk Khyenrab Wangchuk (1864–1873), the 10th Kundeling Lama Tatsak Ngawang Pelden (1875–1886), the 9th Demo Rinpoche Lozang Trinlé (1886–1895)
 13th Dalai Lama (Thubten Gyatso, 1879–1933)
 Regents: the 5th Reting Rinpoche, Jamphel Yeshe Gyaltsen (1934–1941), Taktra Rinpoche (1941–1950)
 14th Dalai Lama (Tenzin Gyatso, 1950–Present)

Panchen Lamas

Dzungar occupation
 Tagtsepa (deputy of Tsewang Rabtan) 1717–1720

Qing rule

Gashi and Pholha princes
 Khangchenné 1721–1727
 Polhané Sönam Topgyé 1728–1747
 Gyurme Namgyal 1747–1750 (son)

Qing imperial residents (Ambans) 

 Sengge 1727–1733 (first)
 Lianyu 1906–1912 (last)

20th century Silöns (prime ministers) 
Changkhyim 1907–1920 
Paljor Dorje Shatra 1907–1923
Sholkhang 1907–1926 
Langdün Künga Wangchuk 1926–1940
acting silöns: Lobsang Tashi and Lukhangwa 1950–1952

Modern political leaders within China

See also
 History of Tibet
 Pre-Imperial Tibet
 Tibetan Empire
 List of emperors of Tibet
 Guge
 Sakya
 Mongol conquest of Tibet
 Tibet under Yuan rule
 Phagmodrupa Dynasty
 Rinpungpa
 Tsangpa
 Ganden Phodrang
 Dalai Lama
 Panchen Lama
 Khoshut Khanate
 Dzungar Khanate
 Chinese expedition to Tibet (1720)
 Tibet under Qing rule
 Tibet (1912–1951)
 List of modern political leaders of Tibet

References

History of Tibet
 
Tibet
Tibet
Tibet-related lists